Omar Rodríguez-López (born 1975) is an American guitarist, songwriter, producer and filmmaker

Omar Rodríguez may refer to:

People
 Omar Rodríguez Cisneros (born 1959), Mexican politician
 Omar Rodríguez (footballer) (born 1981), Colombian footballer
 Omar Rodríguez Saludes (fl. 1995–2003), Cuban dissent journalist

Music
 Omar Rodríguez-López discography
 Omar Rodriguez Lopez Group, 2005 band headed by the American musician
 El Grupo Nuevo de Omar Rodriguez Lopez, 2006 band headed by the American musician
 Omar Rodriguez (album), 2005 album by the American musician
 Omar Rodriguez Lopez & John Frusciante, 2010 album

See also
 Anel Omar Rodríguez (died 2009), Panamanian politician